Seogang-dong is a legal dong, neighbourhood of the Mapo-gu district in Seoul, South Korea.

See also 
Administrative divisions of South Korea

References

External links
 Mapo-gu official website in English
 Map of Mapo-gu at the Mapo-gu official website
 Map of Mapo-gu at the Mapo-gu official website
 Seogang-dong resident office website

Neighbourhoods of Mapo District